Benjamin Franklin Falls (July 1, 1824 - May 12, 1864) was a Medal of Honor recipient, an honor he received for his actions during the American Civil War.

Biography
Falls joined the 19th Massachusetts Volunteer Infantry from Lynn, Massachusetts in August 1861. He earned the Medal of Honor for his bravery during the third day of the Battle of Gettysburg, on July 3, 1863. He captured the color-bearer and colors of the 19th Virginia.  His citation, awarded posthumously on December 1, 1864, simply reads, "capture of flag." He was mortally wounded on May 10, 1864, during the Battle of Spotsylvania Court House, and died two days later.

Following his death, he was interred at Pine Grove Cemetery in Lynn, Massachusetts.

See also

List of Medal of Honor recipients for the Battle of Gettysburg
List of American Civil War Medal of Honor recipients: A–F

References

1824 births
1864 deaths
People of Massachusetts in the American Civil War
Union Army soldiers
United States Army Medal of Honor recipients
American Civil War recipients of the Medal of Honor
Union military personnel killed in the American Civil War